USS Plymouth may refer to the following ships operated by the United States Navy: 

 , a sloop-of-war, was part of Commodore Matthew Perry's Black Fleet
 , a wooden-hulled, screw sloop-of-war, was commissioned as Kenosha and served just after the American Civil War
 , a screw steamer, transported materiel to France during World War I
 , a patrol gunboat, was lost during World War II.

See also
 
 

United States Navy ship names